In photography, vintage prints are typically the earliest prints that the photographer makes soon after developing a negative. Alternatively, vintage prints may also include prints made by the photographer well after negative development if the photographer is deceased. 

Vintage prints are considered original pieces of art, as it is possible to arbitrarily obtain many copies from the same negative, even by others and long after the negative was developed. Vintage prints are often signed by the photographer and establish provenance, but signatures are not required to be vintage prints.

However, in the art market the term is used of old prints - especially earlier 20th century and 19th century examples of lithography, etching or steel engraving.  Really old prints (before c1800) are called Old master prints.

References

Photography by genre